The 2013–14 División de Honor Juvenil de Fútbol season is the 28th since its establishment. The regular season began on September 7, 2013, and ends on April 13, 2014.

Classification

Group I

Group II

Group III

Group IV

Group V

Group VI

Group VII

Copa de Campeones

Quarter-finals

Semifinals

Final

Details

See also
2014 Copa del Rey Juvenil

External links
Royal Spanish Football Federation

División de Honor Juvenil de Fútbol seasons
Juvenil